Frappier may refer to:

People
Armand Frappier
J. H. Frappier
Jill Frappier
Paul Frappier
Roger Frappier

Other
Prix Armand-Frappier, an award by the Government of Quebec, part of the Prix du Québec